Rodrigo Marcos Rodrigues Andrade (born 24 November 2001) is a Portuguese professional footballer who plays as a midfielder for Marítimo B.

Club career
Born in Funchal, Madeira, Andrade joined C.S. Marítimo's youth system at the age of 13. In August 2020 he signed his first professional contract with the club, going on to spend his first seasons as a senior with the reserves in the third division as well as the under-23 side.

Andrade made his Primeira Liga debut for the first team on 16 August 2021, coming on as a late substitute in a 2–1 away win against Belenenses SAD.

References

External links

2001 births
Sportspeople from Funchal
Living people
Portuguese footballers
Madeiran footballers
Association football midfielders
C.S. Marítimo players
Primeira Liga players
Campeonato de Portugal (league) players